Saša Marjanović (born 5 February 2002) is a Bosnian footballer who currently plays for Fortuna Liga club Zemplín Michalovce.

Club career

MFK Zemplín Michalovce
Marjanović made his Slovak league debut for Zemplín Michalovce in an away fixture against MFK Ružomberok on 11 February 2023.

References

External links
 MFK Zemplín Michalovce profile 
 
 
 Futbalnet profile 

2002 births
Living people
Sportspeople from Banja Luka
Bosnia and Herzegovina footballers
Bosnia and Herzegovina youth international footballers
Bosnia and Herzegovina under-21 international footballers
Association football defenders
FK Željezničar Banja Luka players
NK Inter Zaprešić players
HNK Gorica players
MFK Zemplín Michalovce players
Croatian Football League players
First Football League (Croatia) players
Slovak Super Liga players
Expatriate footballers in Croatia
Expatriate footballers in Slovakia
Bosnia and Herzegovina expatriate sportspeople in Croatia
Bosnia and Herzegovina expatriate sportspeople in Slovakia